

File transfer protocols used by multiple programs
The name of the protocol may also be the name of the primary or original application software that uses it.

File transfer protocols used by only one application

Chat protocols used by multiple programs

Bitcoin

See also
 Comparison of file-sharing applications

References

Network protocols